Lushtë (in Albanian) or Ljušta (in Serbian: Љушта) is a village in the municipality of Mitrovica in the District of Mitrovica, Kosovo. According to the 2011 census, it has 637 inhabitants.

Demography 
In 2011 census, the village had in total 637 inhabitants, from whom 636 (99,84 %) were Albanians and one (0,16 %) Bosniak.

Notes

References 

Villages in Mitrovica, Kosovo